Trolleybuses in Tychy serves the city of Tychy, Poland. It is one of only three trolleybus systems still in operation in Poland and was opened on October 1, 1982. Currently the fleet operates exclusively 21 low-floor trolleybuses Solaris Trollino 12. In the past also ZIU-9, Jelcz PR110E and Jelcz 120MT were used.

Traction is powered by two traction substations (2×800 kW and 3×800 kW). Overhead wiring has a cross section of 12 mm² and it hangs 5.8 to 6.2 m above street.

Lines
The six lines of the present Tychy trolleybus system are as follows:

References

External links

 Tychy trolleybus system map
 
 
 Official Website of the Operator TLT (Polish)
 Gallery on transport.asi.pwr.wroc.pl (Polish)

Tychy
Tychy
Tychy
1982 establishments in Poland